Sphingomonas haloaromaticamans  is a bacterium from the genus of Sphingomonas which has been isolated from water and soil in the Netherlands. Sphingomonas haloaromaticamans has the ability to degrade 1,4-dichlorobenzene.

References

Further reading

External links
Type strain of Sphingomonas haloaromaticamans at BacDive -  the Bacterial Diversity Metadatabase

haloaromaticamans
Bacteria described in 2007